Ballyhickey Wedge Tomb is a wedge-shaped gallery grave and National Monument located in County Clare, Ireland.

Location
Ballyhickey Wedge Tomb is located in the Rine River valley, 2 km north of Quin and immediately south of Clooney-Quin GAA grounds.

History
Wedge tombs of this kind were built in Ireland in the early Bronze Age, c. 2500–2000 BC.

Description
A wedge tomb complete with orthostats and roofstones.

References

National Monuments in County Clare
Archaeological sites in County Clare
Tombs in the Republic of Ireland